Lucca Sicula is an Italian comune (municipality) founded in 1622.

Lucca Sicula borders the following municipalities: Bivona, Burgio, Calamonaci, Palazzo Adriano, Villafranca Sicula. It is located in the lower Verdura river valley, and is connected only through a twisting, poor provincial road.

The main activity is agriculture, with production of olive oil and oranges.

Twin towns – sister cities
 Pueblo, United States
 Lucca, Italy

References

Cities and towns in Sicily